The Visualz EP also known as Siah And Yeshua Dapo ED is an EP album by American underground hip-hop duo Siah and Yeshua DapoED released in 1996 by Fondle 'Em Records. The Visualz EP was produced entirely by the duo Siah and Yeshua DapoED and their friend Jon Adler. The scratches were put by DJ Bless.

Owing to having been released only on vinyl record in a small number of copies, the album has never had an official title. Despite the fact the label on the record reads Siah And Yeshua Dapo ED, most of the fans and publishers call the album The Visualz EP.

Upon its release, The Visualz EP received critical acclaim. Sound Colour Vibration wrote "completely under the radar, Siah and Yeshua Dapoed’s The Visualz EP is a timeless creation, bringing the deep sonic journey of jazz and hip hop to one of its highest states".

In 2008 an album titled The Visualz Anthology was released. It had the original tracks as well never released tracks.

Track list 
 Side A (Fur Side)
 "The Visualz" - 3:44
 "Gravity" - 4:05
 "Glass Bottom Boat" (featuring Ken Boogaloo) - 2:32
 "No Soles' Dopest Opus" - 4:55
 Side B (Side Beaz)
 "The Mystery" (featuring Ken Boogaloo) - 3:42
 "A Day Like Any Other" - 11:00

References 

1996 EPs
East Coast hip hop EPs